The following is a referenced list of notable Dutch people of Moroccan origin. Some of the people listed below are immigrants; others are of the second generation. Large-scale immigration to the Netherlands started on 14 May 1969, when the Netherlands and Morocco signed a treaty allowing recruitment of mostly unschooled labourers to work in Dutch mining, industry, construction and agriculture. Most guest workers intended to earn lots of money in a relatively short period and then return home. The fact that their number has risen to over 335,000 people, or over 2 percent of the Dutch population, proves many changed their minds. When the 1973 oil crisis hit the Netherlands, demand for labour greatly diminished and many guest workers lost their jobs.

Before the 1990s, immigration policy was a taboo in the Netherlands, leaving many social problems of immigrants undealt with. Today the situation seems to be getting better, with many prominent Moroccans achieving success in sports (e.g. football player Khalid Boulahrouz), music (e.g. singer Hind Laroussi) and politics (e.g. Rotterdam mayor Ahmed Aboutaleb).

List

See also

Demographics of the Netherlands
Guest worker
List of Dutch people
List of Moroccan people
Moroccan diaspora
Moroccan-Dutch

References

External links
Collective Organisation for Moroccans in The Netherlands (SMN), an advocacy group for Moroccan immigrants

Dutch people
Moroccan

Moroccan